William Russell Sweet (November 18, 1860 – October 15, 1946) was an early American artist, painter and sculptor.

Biography

William Russell Sweet   was known throughout the Narragansett, RI area as "The Painter", (documented by the post office receiving postcards and letter under such title) because of his prolific art works in watercolor and oil paintings, many wall murals done for the Newport, RI mansions, his restoration artwork, and his masterful wood carving of furniture and wall mounts.

Said to be "of gentle, good natured people"  "I consider the Sweets a most remarkable family, not only as natural bone setters, but as an innocent inoffensive, easy going, happy people."  William and his family spend many summer days along the coastline of Rhode Island where he sketched and painted pictorial scenes. On loan to South County History Center by his family, samples of William Russell Sweet carved wood chairs and wall plaques, some of his watercolors, and this magnificent hutch cabinet (photos below) themed upon the classical poem "The Song of Hiawatha" from Henry Wadsworth Longfellow. His great grandson, Carson Young Sweet Ferri Carson Grant has donated several other artworks to the Pettaquamscutt Historical Society Museum in RI. In 2010, William Russell Sweet was included in Marquis Who's Who edition Who was Who in America Art.

Carved wood hutch cabinet themed for Longfellow's poem "Song of Hiawatha"

William Russell Sweet described each section of "The Song of Hiawatha" from Henry Wadsworth Longfellow, which influenced him while creating his artwork and carving the individual panels that comprise the hutch cabinet:

(WRS) "Hiawatha was troubled because his people had no way to record the great events of their life and history, or to give the names of the honored dead, or to remember the wisdom of their ancestors, he showed them how to make picture-writing."

From Section XIV (Picture Writing)
"…Such as these the shapes they painted
On the birch-bark and the deer-skin;…"
"…Thus it was that Hiawatha,
In his wisdom taught the people
All the mysteries of painting,
All the art of Picture-Writing,
On the smooth bark of the birch-tree,
On the white skin of the reindeer,
On the grave-posts of the village…"

(WRS) "Hiawatha traveled far to the west, to the land of the Dacotahs, to woo Minnehaha, the daughter of the Arrow Maker. Just before reaching the Arrow Maker’s wigwam, he stopped to shoot a deer to bring as a present."

From Section X (Hiawatha’s Wooing)
"…To his bow he whispered, "Fail not!"
To his arrow whispered, "Swerve not!"
Sent it singing on its errand,
To the red heart of the roebuck;
Threw the deer across his shoulder,
And sped forward without pausing…"

(WRS)  "Kwasind, "the very strong man", was killed by envious dwarfs as he was floating, asleep, down the river in his canoe. They threw pine cones at him (the only things that could harm him) hitting him on his one vulnerable spot (the top of his head) and he toppled, dead, out of his canoe."

From Section XVIII (The Death of Kwasind)
"…Sideways fell into the river,
Plunged beneath the sluggish water
Headlong, as an otter plunges;
And the birch canoe, abandoned,
Drifted empty down the river,
Bottom upward swerved and drifted:
Nothing more was seen of Kwasind…"

(WRS)  "Hiawatha called on the birch tree to furnish the bark for his canoe, on the cedar for its boughs for the ribs of the canoe, on the fir tree for its resin to make the canoe water-tight, on the tamarack for its fibers to sew the birch bark, on the hedgehog for its quills for the decoration of the canoe."

From Section VII (Hiawatha’s Sailing)
…"Give me of your bark, O Birch-tree!
Of your yellow bark, O Birch-tree!..I a light canoe will build me,…

…"Give me of your boughs, O Cedar!
Of your strong and pliant branches, My canoe to make more steady,
Make more strong and firm beneath me!..."

…"Give me of your roots, O Tamarack!
Of your fibrous roots, O Larch-tree!
My canoe to bind together,…"

…"Give me of your balm, O Fir-tree!
Of your balsam and your resin,
So to close the seams together
That the water may not enter,…"

…"Give me of your quills, O Hedgehog!
All your quills, O Kagh, the Hedgehog!
I will make a necklace of them,
Make a girdle for my beauty,
And two stars to deck her bosom!..."

(WRS)  "Hiawatha set out to catch the sturgeon, Nahma. He lowered his line, made of twisted cedar bark, and challenged Nahma to take the hook."

From Section VIII (Hiawatha Fishing)
…"Take my bait," cried Hiawatha,
Dawn into the depths beneath him,
"Take my bait, O Sturgeon, Nahma!
Come up from below the water,
Let us see which is the stronger!"
And he dropped his line of cedar
Through the clear, transparent water…"

Personal Notes
William Russell Sweet's family Welsh genealogy dates from John Swete 1450 (Traine, Modbury, Devon, England) through Robert Sweet (1552–1578) and Johanna Rainham (London, England) whose son, John Sweet (1579–1637), emigrated with his wife Mary Periam and their three children John, James and Meribah, to Salem, Massachusetts March 20, 1630 on the Winthrop Fleet, which departed from Plymouth, England to arrive in Salem, Massachusetts. In 1636 John Sweet who was granted land by Roger Williams,  as part of the 38 families who traveled with Williams from Massachusetts to establish the colony of Rhode Island based upon principles of complete religious toleration, separation of church and state, and political democracy; values represented in the USA constitution. "Roger Williams insisted that land must be purchased from the Indians, rather than taken from them forcefully, in order to claim title to it. Williams then purchased land from the Narragansett Indians and established the settlement of Providence, Rhode Island."

After John Sweet’s death in 1637, his children John, James and Meribah (renamed Renewed) migrated to southern Rhode Island. John's wife, Mary Periam Sweet, remarried Reverend Ezekiel Holliman and her granddaughter became known in many writing as the 'Widow Sweet' living to 91 years old. The Sweet Family was known for their good disposition, and as natural bone setters. William Russell Sweet was the son of Amos Reynolds Sweet (who helped build the Old Washington County jails in 1858) and Sarah Coggshall Sweet; then married Mary De Laigle Herndon 6/15/1893; and fathered 3 children (Colonel Russell Herndon Sweet, Margaret Grace Waring Sweet-Treat and Leila Augusta Sweet-Hay: members of SAR and DAR) and was buried in the family plot at Oak Dell Historical Cemetery, Peace Dale, RI.  These two sisters, Margaret and Leila lived to over 100 years old. Colonel Russell Herndon Sweet was honored in 1946 with the 'Legion of Merit' award for his brave work in the Military Intelligence Service of the War Department during both World War I and World War II, who married Lucy Humphrey Young in Rhode Island 1919.

The Sweet family were said to be remarkable, happy natured people, William Russell Sweet was known throughout the Narragansett area as ‘Sweet-The Painter’ (The post office delivered postcards under such title) because of his prolific art works in watercolors, gouaches and oils, many wall murals and restorations created for the famed Newport mansions, and his masterful wood carvings of furniture and wall mounts. William and his family spend many summer days along the coast lines of Rhode Island, where he sketched and painted scenes of Rhode Island the fields, forests, waterfronts and local architecture as themes in his watercolors, gouache and oils.

William Russell Sweet carved many pieces including wall plaques, tables and chairs, each of individual themes; such as, the Sweet Coat of Arms, New England sea shells as Quahogs and scallops, maple leaves, nuts and berries, textile weaving patterns, and animals.  William Russell Sweet greatly admired the American Indian and depicted their lifestyle in some of his art pieces.  He mentored others young artists in these wood carving skills.

In 1896, William Russell Sweet created a hutch cabinet themed upon the classical poem "The Song of Hiawatha" by Henry Wadsworth Longfellow published in 1855. William Russell Sweet, painter and sculptor, carved this hutch cabinet using local oak wood. The figures were fashioned from Amos Sweet’s pruned cherry and apple trees (Amos Street) in Peace Dale, RI. This piece of artwork stood in the family parlor and exhibited William’s personal collection of Narragansett Indian ‘art-of-fact’ as arrow heads and stone tools found in the soil around southern Rhode Island. In 2009, Carson Grant and his family donated to the Pettaquamscutt Historical Society Museum The Song of Hiawatha' hutch cabinet which has been refinished and will be a permanent focal art piece in the center gallery in time for the Pettaquamscutt Historical Society's 50 Anniversary.

Footnotes

External links
Pettaquamscutt Historical Society Museum
 "Song of Hiawatha" Theotherpages.org

19th-century American painters
19th-century American male artists
American male painters
20th-century American painters
Painters from Rhode Island
People from Narragansett, Rhode Island
1860 births
1946 deaths
20th-century American sculptors
20th-century American male artists
19th-century American sculptors
American male sculptors